is a passenger railway station in located in the city of Higashiōsaka,  Osaka Prefecture, Japan, operated by the private railway operator Kintetsu Railway.

Lines
Wakae-Iwata Station is served by the Nara Line, and is located 4.1 rail kilometers from the starting point of the line at Fuse Station and 10.2 kilometers from Ōsaka Namba Station.

Station layout
The station consists of two opposed elevated side platforms, with the station building underneath.

Platforms

Adjacent stations

History
It was renamed to its present name in 1925. In 1941 it was transferred to the Kansai Kyūkō Railway, which became part of Kintetsu in 1944.

Passenger statistics
In fiscal 2018, the station was used by an average of 15,832 passengers daily.

Surrounding area
Wakaeiwata Ekimae Urban Redevelopment Building

See also
List of railway stations in Japan

References

External links

 Wakae-Iwata Station 

Railway stations in Osaka Prefecture
Railway stations in Japan opened in 1914
Higashiōsaka